Pholcophora is a genus of cellar spiders that was first described by Nathan Banks in 1896.

Species
 it contains five species, found in Mexico, Canada, the United States, and the Bahamas:
Pholcophora americana Banks, 1896 (type) – USA, Canada
Pholcophora bahama Gertsch, 1982 – Bahama Is.
Pholcophora maria Gertsch, 1977 – Mexico
Pholcophora mexcala Gertsch, 1982 – Mexico
Pholcophora texana Gertsch, 1935 – USA, Mexico

See also
 List of Pholcidae species

References

Araneomorphae genera
Pholcidae
Spiders of North America
Taxa named by Nathan Banks